XHTL-FM is a radio station in Tuxpan, Veracruz. Broadcasting on 91.5 FM, XHTL is known as La Ola.

History

XETL-AM 1390 received its concession in 1941, making it among the first radio stations in Veracruz. It added its FM counterpart in 1994 and shuttered its AM station by surrendering the frequency in 2017.

References

Radio stations in Veracruz